Harp Township is one of thirteen townships in DeWitt County, Illinois, USA.  As of the 2010 census, its population was 311 and it contained 136 housing units.

History
The earliest known pioneer to settle in Harp Township was Solomon Cross who erected a log cabin deep in the solitude of a forest of oak trees in 1830.  The cabin was 16'x18', square and built of rough unhewn logs.  The cabin stood fifty years before it was destroyed.

At about the same time as the Cross family, Jesse Mulkey and his brother-in-law Baltus Malone located in the township after a long journey from Kentucky at what would become known as Mulkey's Point.  Mulkey and Malone's stay in the area would be short, abandoning their cabin after just over a year's time.  Soon however, Felix Jones took possession of the old Mulkey cabin and constructed the first orchard in the township.  Mulkey's Point also contained significant evidence of Indian camps and hunting grounds.  Many of the trinkets and items found were shown to visitors of another early township resident, J. W. McCord.

1831 brought many new faces to the township including Isaac Davidson who came from Tennessee, but his life in the township would be very short as he died that same year.  Davidson became the first burial in the township.  The exact date is lost to history, but it occurred in the month of October, 1831.  Soon after that same month, William Cross became the second resident to pass on.  William was a brother to Solomon Cross and was buried on section thirty-two.  In 1832, Harp township had a happier first as it celebrated its first marriage in the township.  Mary Cross accepted the proposal of Martin Dale despite her parents opposition, and the couple were married in 1832.

Tyre Harp and Joseph Harp located their families on section twenty-nine in 1831.  They came to the township from Overton County, Tennessee, but had lived a brief time in Waynesville, Illinois prior to settling in Harp Township.  The first school in the township was taught from the home of Tyre Harp in 1836.  The following year, Tyre Harp, Pleasant Smith and Dudley Richards contributed $110 towards paying for a six months school and erected the first schoolhouse, a  x18ft foot cabin where Edom Shugert from Tennessee (who had also taught in Tyre Harp's home) took charge of the school.  Tyre was also a shoemaker, crafting all of the shoes for his family.  The Harp family was very prominent in the township, which is in fact named after their family.  They are also credited with being one of the few families of the early settlers to remain permanent residents of the township.

The first land entries recorded in the township are as follows:

April 6, 1831, John Norfleet, entered W 1/2, N.W 1/4 Section 23, 80 acres.
June 16, 1831, William Kincaid, entered, 240 acres, Section 24.
July 8, 1831, William H. Brown, entered W 1/3, S.W 1/4.
August 2, 1831, Parmenius Smallwood, entered W 1/2, S.W. 1/4, Section 33, 80 acres.
July 17, 1833, Tyre Harp, entered E 1/2, S.W. 1/4, Section 29,  acres.
April 21, 1834, Gabriel Watt, entered N.E 1/4, S.E 1/4, Section 24, 40 Acres.
January 3, 1835, J. Pue, entered S 1/2, S.E. 1/4, Section 36, 80 acres.

One of the earliest camp-meeting grounds was on section 25 where Winding Clark held services in 1835.  Families came from miles around to enjoy the village of cabins erected here.  A platform constructed for the preachers and benches arranged of  partially hewn logs helped to offer good cheer and spiritual inspiration.  Reverend John St. Clair was present during this time.

Jefferson Cross became the first justice of the peace elected to office in the township and Solomon Despain who located in Waynesville in 1830 before locating in Harp Township in 1837 became the first blacksmith to set up shop.  Despain was also a Baptist preacher.  Despain built his smithy on land owned by William Garrison Wright who had married Tyre Harp's daughter Leah in 1834.  A second smithy would later be built near Wilson's mill in 1860 by a man named Leonard.

The first road in the township led from Clinton, IL to Marion and was cut by Hugh L. Davenport.  By this time the U.S. mail delivered to Clinton where township residents would commute, which was preferable to the longer trip to Bloomington, Illinois to the north.  The Gilman branch of the Illinois Central Railroad passes through the township from east to west, entering on section 24, and leaving on section 30.  Much litigation surrounded the railroad from people refusing to honor bonds because of non-compliance by the railroad company, one such matter brought by Thomas Snell on section 20 leading to the construction of a switch in the winter of 1882.

Township veterans served in the Mexican War and in the Black Hawk War.  William Harp, Charles Harp, Calvin Paine, Isaac M'Cuddy, David Beebe, Isaac Strain and Joshua Jackson all served in the Mexican War and William Garrison Wright served in the Black Hawk War.

Geography
This township includes part of Clinton Lake and Clinton Nuclear Generating Station. The North Fork of Salt Creek and Illinois Route 54 pass through the township as well.

Unincorporated towns
 Birkbeck at 
(This list is based on USGS data and may include former settlements.)

Cemeteries
The township contains these two cemeteries: Griffith and Willmore.

Airports and landing strips
 Thorp Airport

School districts
 Blue Ridge Community Unit School District 18
 Clinton Community Unit School District 15
 Deland-Weldon Community Unit School District 57

Political districts
 Illinois's 15th congressional district
 State House District 87
 State Senate District 44

References
 
 United States Census Bureau 2009 TIGER/Line Shapefiles
 United States National Atlas

External links
 City-Data.com
 Illinois State Archives
 Township Officials of Illinois
 Harp page on www.dewitt.ilgenweb.net

Townships in DeWitt County, Illinois
Populated places established in 1858
1858 establishments in Illinois
Townships in Illinois